Thomas Rosenkranz is a contemporary American pianist, noted for performances of modern and international music.

Studies
Rosenkranz, born in 1977, studied with Robert Shannon at the Oberlin Conservatory and with Nelita True at the Eastman School of Music where he received a Doctoral degree in Performance and was awarded the Performer's Certificate. He also studied privately with Yvonne Loriod-Messiaen in Paris.

Awards and concert appearances
Rosenkranz was the National Winner of the MTNA Collegiate Piano Competition in 1999 and was awarded the Classical Fellowship from the American Pianists Association in 2003. His recital activities have taken him throughout the world with performances at the Lincoln Center (New York), Kennedy Center (D.C.), 92nd Street Y (New York), Hilbert Circle Theatre (Indianapolis), Poly Theatre (Beijing), National Concert Hall (Shanghai), L'Acropolium (Carthage), Théâtre de la Ville (Tunis), Shanghai Contemporary Festival (Shanghai), International House of Tokyo (Tokyo), and Poly Theatre (Beijing). He has appeared as soloist with the Indianapolis Symphony Orchestra, the National Orchestra of Beirut, Northwest Chamber Orchestra and was the featured soloist for the Oberlin Orchestra's 2006 Tour of China. He has also worked directly with many notable contemporary composers including George Crumb, Frederic Rzewski, John Adams (composer), and Steve Reich.

Artistic Ambassador
As an Artistic Ambassador sponsored by the United States Department of State, Rosenkranz has traveled to Tunisia more than a dozen times to perform with local Tunisian musicians at such notable venues as the Roman Amphitheatre of Carthage and the Tabarka Jazz Festival. In the summer of 2009 he returned as a cultural specialist in a unique collaboration with the American Embassy of Tunisia where he presented a recital and a week-long master class for the region's most promising pianists. His 2008 solo tour of China and Inner Mongolia included stops in Dalian, Shenyang, and in Dashiqiao where he presented the first public piano recital in the history of the city. He continues to travel to Taiwan each year to give concerts and master classes at Tunghai University and the National Hualien School of Education.

Educator
In addition to his concert engagements, the education of musicians plays an important role in his musical activities. He has been presented in master class at such notable institutions as the Shanghai Conservatory, Shenyang Conservatory, and Northwestern University. He has been Artist-in-Residence at the Institutes of Music of Beirut and Tunis and each summer teaches courses on contemporary music and improvisation at the SoundScape Festival in Italy. He was the founder of the Hawaii Institute for Contemporary Music and has served as a jury member at the Oberlin International Piano Competition and Festival. A former faculty member at the University of Hawaii at Manoa and Bowling Green State University, he is currently on the faculty at the Conservatory of Music and Dance at the University of Missouri-Kansas City.

Recordings
Steve Reich - Triple Quartet (Nonesuch, 2001), with the ensemble Alarm Will Sound.
Steve Reich - Tehillim / The Desert Music (Cantaloupe Music, 2002), with the ensemble Alarm Will Sound.
Mark Applebaum - Catfish (Tzadik, 2003), premiere recording of "Omnibus Etude" for solo piano.
Le Minaret et la Tour (Cristal Records France, 2005), works of Riadh Fehri.
The Oberlin Orchestra in China (Oberlin Records, 2007), soloist for Rhapsody in Blue by George Gershwin.
Brian Hulse - Pseudosynthesis (Albany Records, 2009), premiere recording of "For Rumi" with flutist Lisa Cella.

References
 (2005-02-01); Salmon, John; "Fellows of the American Pianists Association.(2005 MTNA National Conference Artists)"; American Music Teacher.
 (2005-12-21); Lacheva, Elena; "Oberlin College: Oberlin College orchestra to travel to China"; The America's Intelligence Wire
(2007-03-09) Toth, Catherine E; "All-star concert today at UH"; The Honolulu Advertiser.
 (2003-03); "A Year of Adventures on the High Keys for Conservatory Keyboard Students and Graduates"'; Oberlin Online
 (2008-09-07); "An American Pianist opens the Medina Festival"; Embassy of the United States News

Living people
1977 births
American male pianists
21st-century American pianists
21st-century American male musicians
Bowling Green State University faculty